The Anti-Saloon League launched the Board of Temperance Strategy to coordinate resistance to the growing public demand for the repeal of prohibition (1920–1933) that was occurring in the U.S. during the early 1930s.

The Board of Temperance Strategy consisted of representatives from 33 major anti-alcohol or temperance organizations. The effort failed and the national prohibition of alcohol was repealed in December 1933.

References

Roizen, Ron (1991), The American Discovery of Alcoholism, Ph.D. dissertation, University of California at Berkeley, Berkeley, CA.

Temperance organizations in the United States